The Random House Encyclopedia is an English language one-volume encyclopaedia published by Random House. Its first edition was published in 1977 and revised edition in 1990. It was divided into two sections: Colorpedia, which is made of lengthy articles and Alphapedia, which has short alphabetically arranged ones. There was an electronic format made of the encyclopaedia from its 1990 edition. It was made for the MS-DOS 3.3 operating system and was distributed on sixteen 5 -inch floppy disks and also on eight 3 -inch floppy disks. It has more than 20,000 articles.

Contents 
  
 Preface 6
 Staff, Contributors, and Consultants 8 
 Organization of the Encyclopedia 12   
 Colorpedia: Detailed Contents 16 
 Time Chart: Contents 28  
 Atlas: Contents 29 
 Colorpedia: Text 30
 The Universe 32
 The Earth 160
 Life on Earth 400 
 Man 640
 History and Culture 944
 Man and Science 1432
 Man and Machines 1576
 Time Chart: Text 1825
 Alphapedia 1876 
 Bibliography 2761 
 Picture Credits 2771 
 Art Credits 2781 
 Atlas of the World A1 
 Atlas Index A83

References

American encyclopedias
1977 non-fiction books
Random House books
20th-century encyclopedias